Oxyrrhepes is a genus of grasshoppers in the family Acrididae and subfamily Catantopinae; it is the only genus placed in tribe Oxyrrhepini Tinkham, 1940.

The recorded distribution of species includes: Sri Lanka, China, Indo-China and Malesia.

Species
The Orthoptera Species File lists:
Oxyrrhepes cantonensis Tinkham, 1940 - China
Oxyrrhepes meyeri Willemse, 1936 - Sulawesi
Oxyrrhepes obtusa Haan, 1842 - type species (as Opsomala lineatitarsis Stål) - China, Vietnam, Sri Lanka, Malesia

References

External links
Photo at Flickr: Oxyrrhepes obtusa by Tyus Ma

Acrididae genera
Catantopinae
Orthoptera of Indo-China